The following is a list of book podcasts.

List

References

External links 
 Book Podcasts on Podchaser
 Book Podcasts on Player.fm

Lists of podcasts
Book podcasts